Bay Minette is a city in and the county seat of Baldwin County, Alabama, United States. As of the 2010 census, the population of the city was 8,044.

History
In the first days of Baldwin County, the town of McIntosh Bluff (now in Mobile County, west of Baldwin County) on the Tombigbee River was the county seat. After being transferred to the town of Blakeley in 1810, the county seat was later moved to the city of Daphne in 1868. In 1900, by an act of the legislature of Alabama, the county seat was authorized for relocation to the city of Bay Minette; however, the city of Daphne resisted relocation. The citizens of Bay Minette moved the county records from Daphne in the middle of the night on October 11–12, 1901 and delivered them to the city of Bay Minette - where the Baldwin County seat remains to this day. A mural for the new post office built in 1937 was commissioned by the WPA and painted by Hilton Leech, to commemorate this event.

In September 2011, the town attempted to enact a program called "Operation Restore Our Community". It would have allowed those convicted of a misdemeanor to substitute imprisonment with mandatory church attendance for one year. However, this program was challenged due to violating separation of church and state, and the program's start was delayed for judicial review. It appears to have been scrapped.

Geography
Bay Minette is located near the center of Baldwin County in southern Alabama at  (30.883446, -87.777183). U.S. Route 31 passes through the center of the city, leading south to Spanish Fort and northeast to Atmore.

Climate
The climate in this area is characterized by hot, humid summers and generally mild to cool winters.  According to the Köppen Climate Classification system, Bay Minette has a humid subtropical climate, abbreviated "Cfa" on climate maps.

Demographics

Bay Minette is part of the Daphne–Fairhope–Foley Micropolitan Statistical Area.

2020 Census data

As of the 2020 United States census, there were 8,107 people, 2,812 households, and 1,690 families residing in the city.

2010 Census data
As of the census of 2010, there were 8,040 people, 2,744 households, and 1,884 families residing in the city. The racial makeup of the city was 60.4% White, 35.3% Black or African American, 1.0% Native American, 0.8% Asian, 0.0% Pacific Islander, 0.8% from other races, and 1.7% from two or more races. 1.8% of the population were Hispanic or Latino of any race.

There were 2,744 households, out of which 30.6% had children under the age of 18 living with them, 41.6% were married couples living together, 21.5% had a female householder with no husband present, and 31.3% were non-families. 27.6% of all households were made up of individuals, and 11.4% had someone living alone who was 65 years of age or older. The average household size was 2.53 and the average family size was 3.08.

In the city, the population was 23.6% under the age of 18, 13.7% from 18 to 24, 24.0% from 25 to 44, 24.1% from 45 to 64, and 14.5% who were 65 years of age or older. The median age was 35.2 years. For every 100 females, there were 93.8 males. For every 100 females age 18 and over, there were 95.9 males. The median income for a household in the city was $32,389, and the median income for a family was $44,573. Males had a median income of $37,623 versus $23,125 for females. The per capita income for the city was $16,897. About 17.1% of families and 26.4% of the population were below the poverty line, including 33.9% of those under age 18 and 18.8% of those age 65 or over.

Government

Bay Minette uses a mayor council government. The mayor is elected at large. The city council consists of five members who are elected from one of five districts.

Education

Public schools
Bay Minette is a part of the Baldwin County Public Schools system.

High schools
 Baldwin County High School (grades 9 through 12)
 North Baldwin Center for Technology (grades 9 through 12)

Middle school
 Bay Minette Middle School (grades 7 and 8)

Intermediate school
 Bay Minette Intermediate School (grades 4 through 6)

Elementary school
 Bay Minette Elementary School (grades K through 3)

Higher education 
 Faulkner State Community College

Culture
Portions of the movie Close Encounters of the Third Kind were filmed near the town's Louisville and Nashville Railroad depot, and Friday the 13th Part VII: The New Blood was filmed in rural portions of Baldwin County near Bay Minette.

Transportation
Bay Minette Municipal Airport (1R8) is located 3 nautical miles (6 km) southwest of the central business district of Bay Minette. 

Intercity bus service is provided by Greyhound Lines.

Routes passing through the city include US 31 and Alabama State Route 59.

Notable people
Alton Moore, defensive end for Auburn University and NFL player Arizona Cardnials 
Wallace Gilberry, defensive end for the Cincinnati Bengals
Todd Grisham, sports announcer for ESPN
Ellis Hooks, soul blues singer and songwriter was born here
John McMillan, State Treasurer of Alabama 
Anthony Mix, former wide receiver for Auburn University and NFL player
Joe M. Rodgers, United States Ambassador to France
Scotty Joe Weaver, hate crime victim featured in the documentary Small Town Gay Bar

References

External links

 City of Bay Minette
 Bay Minette Airport

Populated coastal places in Alabama
Cities in Alabama
Cities in Baldwin County, Alabama
County seats in Alabama